Kimiko Elizabeth Glenn (born June 27, 1989) is an American actress and Broadway performer known for portraying Brook Soso in the Netflix series Orange Is the New Black, for which she received three ensemble Screen Actors Guild Awards. She also starred as Dawn Pinkett in the Broadway musical Waitress and has provided the voices of Ezor in Voltron: Legendary Defender, Lena Sabrewing in DuckTales, Peni Parker in Spider-Man: Into the Spider-Verse, Stefani Stilton in BoJack Horseman, Bridgette Hashima in Close Enough, Horse in Centaurworld, Izzy Moonbow in My Little Pony: A New Generation, Paperstar in Carmen Sandiego, and the title character in Kiff.

Early life and education
Glenn was born and raised in Phoenix, Arizona, with her sister, Amanda. Her mother, Sumiko, is Japanese, and her father, Mark, is of Scottish, Irish, and German descent. Glenn began acting at the Valley Youth Theatre in Phoenix and several other local theaters when she was in fifth grade. She attended Desert Vista High School in Phoenix and the Interlochen Arts Academy boarding school in Interlochen, Michigan. She attended the Boston Conservatory for a year as a musical theatre major, but dropped out when she was cast in the touring company of Spring Awakening.

Career
During her freshman year of college, in 2008, Glenn was cast as Thea in the first U.S. national tour of Steven Sater's and Duncan Sheik's rock musical Spring Awakening. In 2013, she booked her breakthrough role as Litchfield Penitentiary inmate Brook Soso in the Netflix comedy-drama series Orange Is the New Black, for which she received Screen Actors Guild Awards in 2014, 2015, and 2016 for Outstanding Performance by an Ensemble in a Comedy Series.

In 2014, she appeared in the Lena Dunham-directed music video "I Wanna Get Better" for Jack Antonoff's solo project Bleachers.

Glenn played the supporting role of Liv Kurosawa in the drama-thriller film Nerve (2016), directed by Henry Joost and Ariel Schulman and based on the young adult novel of the same name. In 2016, she was cast as Dawn Pinkett in the Broadway transfer production of Sara Bareilles's and Jessie Nelson's musical Waitress. Preview performances began on March 25, 2016, at the Brooks Atkinson Theatre, and the show officially opened on April 24.

In 2018, Glenn began starring as Harlow in the comedy Web television series Liza on Demand, with Travis Coles and creator Liza Koshy. In 2019, she was a guest presenter with Nev Schulman on the MTV show Catfish.

In 2021, Glenn provided the voice of Izzy Moonbow in the Netflix animated film My Little Pony: A New Generation.

In 2023, Glenn lended her voice to Kiff Chatterley, the eponymous protagonist of the Disney Channel animated original series Kiff.

Personal life 
Glenn is a pescatarian.

Filmography

Film

Television

Music videos

Stage

Web

References

External links
 
 
 
 
 

Living people
Actresses from Phoenix, Arizona
American actresses of Japanese descent
American film actresses
American film actors of Asian descent
American people of German descent
American people of Irish descent
American people of Scottish descent
American stage actresses
American television actresses
American voice actresses
Boston Conservatory at Berklee alumni
21st-century American actresses
American web series actresses
1989 births